Delta (born August 27, 1985) is a Mexican Luchador enmascarado, or masked professional wrestler currently working for the Mexico City based professional wrestling promotion Consejo Mundial de Lucha Libre (CMLL). Delta's real name is not a matter of public record, as is often the case with masked wrestlers in Mexico where their private lives are kept a secret from the wrestling fans. Delta is the son of wrestler Trueno and previously wrestled as Hijo del Trueno ("Son of Thunder"), his brother currently works for CMLL wrestling under the ring name Trueno like their father, although the family relationship has not been publicly acknowledged by CMLL.

Personal life
The wrestler currently known as Delta was born on August 27, 1985 in Monterrey, Nuevo León, Mexico and grew up watching his father wrestle under a mask as "Trueno" (Spanish for "Thunder"). Trueno wore an outfit closely resembling the red and yellow outfit of the comic book character The Flash and worked for Consejo Mundial de Lucha Libre in the 1970s. The future Delta attended the Regiomontana University where he got a degree in business administration in tourism. He later stated that while he was not required to get a college degree to become a professional wrestler he knew he needed something to fall back on. From an early age the future Delta played football, starting as a child at AFAIM he also played for the Autonomous University of Nuevo León, Authentic Tigers later on for the Regiomontana University Jaguars as well. He got a degree in Tourism Business Administration to have a skill to rely on outside of wrestling. Delta is the father of a girl of school age.

Professional wrestling career
The future Delta began training for a professional wrestling career while he was still at college, spending over four years training under his father, while simultaneously keeping up with his school work. He first started wrestling in 2003 under the name "Blue Angel, Jr.", not revealing his family relationship. In May, 2007 he made his debut under the name "Hijo del Trueno", wearing a thunderbolt adorned mask and trunks like hi father. He worked for various independent promotions, especially in his home state of Monterrey.

Delta (2009–present)
In 2009 he achieved one of his childhood dreams as he began working for Consejo Mundial de Lucha Libre based in Mexico City, Mexico. In CMLL he received further training from Franco Colombo as well as a new ring name, mask and outfit as he became "Delta". He made his CMLL debut on August 8, 2009, teaming up with Sensei to defeat Los Romanos (Caligula and Messala) in the opening match of CMLL's Saturday Night show in Arena México. In late 2009 CMLL vacated the Mexican National Trios Championship when Black Warrior, who was 1/3 of the championship team left CMLL. As a result, they held an eight-team elimination tournament to crown new champions. Delta teamed up with Leono and Valiente for the tournament. In their first match as a trio the team defeated Diamante, Pegasso and Rey Cometa, but lost to Poder Mexica (Sangre Azteca, Dragón Rojo Jr. and Misterioso II) in the second round. In April, 2010 Delta participated in the 2010 Torneo Gran Alternativa ("Great Alternative Tournament"). The Gran Alternativa tournament is an annual CMLL tournament that teams a veteran and a rookie (Novato) up for a tag team tournament. Delta was placed in "Block B" and teamed up with the Veteran Volador Jr. When the rúdo (bad guy) team of Pólvora and Héctor Garza won block B several sources stated that Delta and Volador Jr. were the favorites to win Block B. On March 23, 2010 Delta and Volador Jr. defeated Tiger Kid and El Felino in the first round and Raziel and Averno in the second round. In the final round of Block A the team faced Puma King and Último Guerrero. Delta's partner Volador Jr. was eliminated first leaving Delta to face both opponents. In a match that helped showcase Delta's talent he eliminated both Puma King and Guerrero to qualify for the finals of the Gran Alternativa tournament. The finals took place on the April 30, 2010 Super Viernes, where Delta and Volador Jr. were defeated by Pólvora and Héctor Garza. In November 2010 Delta was entered into an online poll to determine a new one third of the Mexican National Trios Champions, after Máscara Dorada had relinquished his part of the title. On December 20, 2010, CMLL announced that Delta had defeated Ángel de Oro and Diamante in the poll and named him new Mexican National Trios Champion, alongside Metro and Stuka Jr. On January 9, 2011, Delta, Metro and Stuka Jr. lost the Mexican National Trios Championship to Ángel de Oro, Diamante and Rush.

In June 2011, Delta teamed with Atlantis and Guerrero Maya Jr. in the Forjando un Ídolo tournament, which they eventually went on to win. On November 16, Atlantis announced that he was officially forming a stable named Los Reyes de la Atlantida ("The Kings of the Atlantis") with Delta and Guerrero Maya Jr. On December 16, the trio defeated Los Invasores (Olímpico, Psicosis II and Volador Jr.) for the Mexican National Trios Championship at CMLL's Sin Piedad show. On June 22, Los Reyes de la Atlantida lost the title to Los Depredadores del Aire (Black Warrior, Mr. Águila and Volador Jr.). On October 30, Los Reyes de la Atlantida regained the Mexican National Trios Championship from Los Depredadores del Aire. They lost the title to the Los Invasores team of Kraneo, Mr. Águila and Psicosis II on December 16, 2012. In March, 2013 Delta was forced to team up with Tiger to compete in the 2013 Torneo Nacional de Parejas Increibles ("National Incredible Pairs Tournament") where the concept was that rivals, or at least wrestlers on opposite sides of the rudo/tecnico divide would team up for a tag team tournament. Delta and Tiger had no previous rivalry and in fact wore matching colored outfits for the tournament as a sign of team unity. Despite their unity the team was eliminated by the team of Blue Panther and Rey Escorpión in the first round of the tournament. In March, 2013 Delta was announced as participating in the 2013 En Busca de un Ídolo ("In search of an Idol") tournament. When the official details of the tournament was revealed in early May Delta had been removed as a competitor. On November 3, Delta and Guerrero Maya Jr. defeated La Fiebre Amarilla (Namajague and Okumura) to win the CMLL Arena Coliseo Tag Team Championship. Delta's reign with the Arena Coliseo Tag Team Championship ended over 400 days later when the team lost to La Comando Caribeño ("The Caribbean Commando"; Misterioso Jr. and Sagrado) on February 28, 2015. On April 26, 2015, Los Reyes de la Atlantida won the Mexican National Trios Championship for a record-breaking third time by defeating La Peste Negra (El Felino, Mr. Niebla and Negro Casas).

In May, 2015 CMLL competed in a qualifying match for the 2015 version of En Busca de un Ídoloas one of 16 wrestlers in the qualifying torneo cibernetico, elimination match where the last eight wrestlers would qualify for the tournament. He competed against Akuma, Blue Panther Jr., Cancerbero, Canelo Casas, Disturbio, Esfinge, Flyer, El Gallo, Guerrero Maya Jr., Joker, Pegasso, Raziel, Sagrado, Stigma and Boby Zavala. During the match Delta eliminated Cancerbero and was one of the eight wrestlers to survive the match. During the En Busca de un Ídolo the wrestlers would face off in a round-robin first round earning points based on the outcome. After the match each wrestler would receive critique and points from a four-man judging panel rating them on the match they just saw. Finally all wrestlers would be given additional points from a weekly online poll open to fans. During the first round Delta defeated Boby Zavala, Esfinge and Flyer but would end up losing to Canelo Casas, Disturbio and his tag team partner Guerrero Maya Jr. For the final match Delta was supposed to wrestle Blue Panther Jr. as part of the 2015 Sin Salida show, but Blue Panther Jr. did not show up so Delta defeated Hechicero instead. The tournament saw several of the judges be very critical of Delta's performances during the matches, although it was acknowledge that at least some of the early problems were due to a knee injury. Delta's lowest score was a 20 out of 40 and his highest was 27 points. Delta ended up with 132 points in total from the judges, the lowest of all eight wrestlers. In the end Delta was eliminated from the tournament before the final week's poll results as he was over 40 points out of fourth place making it impossible for him to move that far up the rankings. On August 9, 2015 Los Reyes de la Atlantida lost the Mexican National Trios Championship to Los Hijos del Infierno ("The Sons of the Inferno"; Ephesto, Mephisto and Lucifierno), ending their third reign as champions.

Championships and accomplishments
 Consejo Mundial de Lucha Libre
 CMLL Arena Coliseo Tag Team Championship (1 time) – with Guerrero Maya Jr.
 Mexican National Trios Championship (4 times) – with Metro and Stuka Jr. (1) and Atlantis and Guerrero Maya Jr. (3)
 Arena Coliseo Tag Team Championship #1 Contendership Tournament (2010) – with Diamante
 Forjando un Ídolo: La Guerra Continúa (2011) – with Atlantis and Guerrero Maya Jr.
 CMLL Rookie of the Year (2010)

Luchas de Apuestas record

References

1985 births
Masked wrestlers
Mexican male professional wrestlers
Living people
Professional wrestlers from Nuevo León
Sportspeople from Monterrey
Unidentified wrestlers
21st-century professional wrestlers
Mexican National Trios Champions